Bergson is a surname. Notable people with the surname include:

 Abram Bergson (1914–2003), American economist
 Brian Merritt Bergson (born 1964), American politician
 Henri Bergson (1859–1941), French philosopher
 Herb Bergson, American politician
 Maria Bergson, architect
 Michał Bergson (1820–1898), Polish composer and pianist
 Moina Mathers (born Mina Bergson) (1865–1928), Swiss-born British artist and occultist
 Peter Bergson, pseudonym of Zionist activist Hillel Kook (1915–2001)

Fictional characters:
 Bill Bergson, boy detective created by Swedish writer Astrid Lindgren

See also
 Bergsson